Lu Lin may refer to:

Lü Lin (table tennis) (吕林, born 1969), a Chinese table tennis player
Lu Lin (footballer) (卢琳, born 1985), a Chinese football player

See also
 Lulin (disambiguation)